Henry Peter  Zwar, OBE (2 December 1873 – 12 January 1959) was an Australian liberal/conservative politician, local government councillor, local government head, Member of Lower House and tannery owner.

Early life
Zwar was born in 1873 in Broadford, Victoria, the younger brother of Albert Zwar. His parents, Michael Zwar and Agnes Zimmer, were Sorbs from Bautzen in Saxony, Germany, who had sought asylum after taking part in the 1848 revolution. The British government told them if they emigrated to Australia, they would be treated as British subjects, and they moved to Broadford in 1850.

Political career

Zwar was elected as a United Australia Party member of the Victorian Legislative Assembly for Heidelberg at the 1932 state election. He was re-elected four times for the United Australia Party, and regularly attended and voted in party meetings, though he did not necessarily vote the party line, claiming "conscience as the final court of appeal".

The UAP had become the Liberal Party by the 1945 election, at which an electoral redistribution abolished Heidelberg, placing Zwar in the new, notionally Labor seat of Preston, while shifting the more conservative areas of his old electorate to the new seat of Ivanhoe. In October 1945, Zwar announced that he would not be an endorsed Liberal candidate for the forthcoming election and would contest as an Independent Liberal; he also stated that he did not belong to the Liberal Party and paid no party subscription. He was defeated by 143 votes by Labor candidate and Victoria Cross holder William Ruthven.

Later life
Zwar was president of the Preston Football Club from 1926 until 1944, then served as president of the Victorian Football Association from May 1944 until 1947.

Zwar died in Kew, Melbourne, Victoria.

References

1873 births
1959 deaths
Members of the Victorian Legislative Assembly
Australian Officers of the Order of the British Empire
Australian Anglicans
Australian people of German descent
VFA/VFL administrators
People of Sorbian descent
Burials in Victoria (Australia)
20th-century Australian businesspeople
20th-century Australian politicians
People educated at Melbourne Grammar School
People from Preston, Victoria
Victoria (Australia) local councillors
Mayors of places in Victoria (Australia)